In astronomy or planetary science, the frost line, also known as the snow line or ice line, is the particular distance in the solar nebula from the central protostar where it is cold enough for volatile compounds such as water, ammonia, methane, carbon dioxide, and carbon monoxide to condense into solid ice grains.

Each volatile substance has its own snow line (e.g. carbon monoxide, nitrogen, and argon), so it is important to always specify which material's snow line is meant. A tracer gas may be used for materials that are difficult to detect; for example diazenylium for carbon monoxide.

The term is borrowed from the notion of "frost line" in soil science.

Location
Different volatile compounds have different condensation temperatures at different partial pressures (thus different densities) in the protostar nebula, so their respective frost lines will differ. The actual temperature and distance for the snow line of water ice depend on the physical model used to calculate it and on the theoretical solar nebula model:
 170 K at 2.7 AU (Hayashi, 1981) 
 143 K at 3.2 AU to 150 K at 3 AU (Podolak and Zucker, 2010) 
 3.1 AU (Martin and Livio, 2012)
 ≈150 K for μm-size grains and ≈200 K for km-size bodies (D'Angelo and Podolak, 2015)

Current snow line versus formation snow line
The radial position of the condensation/evaporation front varies over time, as the nebula evolves. 
Occasionally, the term snow line is also used to represent the present distance at which water ice can be stable (even under direct sunlight). This current snow line distance is different from the formation snow line distance during the formation of the Solar System, and approximately equals 5 AU. The reason for the difference is that during the formation of the Solar System, the solar nebula was an opaque cloud where temperatures were lower close to the Sun, and the Sun itself was less energetic. After formation, the ice got buried by infalling dust and it has remained stable a few meters below the surface. If ice within 5 AU is exposed, e.g. by a crater, then it sublimates on short timescales. However, out of direct sunlight ice can remain stable on the surface of asteroids (and the Moon and Mercury) if it is located in permanently shadowed polar craters, where temperature may remain very low over the age of the Solar System (e.g. 30–40 K on the Moon).

Observations of the asteroid belt, located between Mars and Jupiter, suggest that the water snow line during formation of the Solar System was located within this region. The outer asteroids are icy C-class objects (e.g. Abe et al. 2000; Morbidelli et al. 2000) whereas the inner asteroid belt is largely devoid of water. This implies that when planetesimal formation occurred the snow line was located at around 2.7 AU from the Sun.
 
For example, the dwarf planet Ceres with semi-major axis of 2.77 AU lies almost exactly on the lower estimation for water snow line during the formation of the Solar System. Ceres appears to have an icy mantle and may even have a water ocean below the surface.

Planet formation
The lower temperature in the nebula beyond the frost line makes many more solid grains available for accretion into planetesimals and eventually planets. The frost line therefore separates terrestrial planets from giant planets in the Solar System.
However, giant planets have been found inside the frost line around several other stars (so-called hot Jupiters). They are thought to have formed outside the frost line, and later migrated inwards to their current positions.  Earth, which lies less than a quarter of the distance to the frost line but is not a giant planet, has adequate gravitation for keeping methane, ammonia, and water vapor from escaping it. Methane and ammonia are rare in the Earth's atmosphere only because of their instability in an oxygen-rich atmosphere that results from life forms (largely green plants) whose biochemistry suggests plentiful methane and ammonia at one time, but of course liquid water and ice, which are chemically stable in such an atmosphere, form much of the surface of Earth.

Researchers Rebecca Martin and Mario Livio have proposed that asteroid belts may tend to form in the vicinity of the frost line, due to nearby giant planets disrupting planet formation inside their orbit. By analysing the temperature of warm dust found around some 90 stars, they concluded that the dust (and therefore possible asteroid belts) was typically found close to the frost line. The underlying mechanism may be the thermal instability of snow line on the timescales of 1,000 - 10,000 years, resulting in periodic deposition of  dust material in relatively narrow circumstellar rings.

See also
Circumstellar habitable zone
Nebular hypothesis
Solar nebula

References

External links 

 The thermal structure and the location of the snow line in the protosolar nebula: axisymmetric models with full 3-D radiative transfer by M. Min, C.P. Dullemond, M. Kama, C. Dominik 
 On the Snow Line in Dusty Protoplanetary Disks by D. D. Sasselov and M. Lecar

Planetary science
Cold